The Ghana Freedom Party is a party founded by Akua Donkor, a farmer. This was largely to help her ambitions to become President of Ghana.

Disqualifications
She was disqualified by the Electoral Commission of Ghana from contesting the Ghanaian presidential election, 2012 as an independent candidate. This was due to irregularities on the registration documents for the election. Akua Donkor who was this time the party's candidate for the Ghanaian presidential election, 2016 was again disqualified in October 2016. She appeared to back the incumbent president at the time, John Mahama when her candidacy was rejected by the Electoral Commission. The party headquarters was sited at Kabu, which is a village in the Akwapim North Municipality of the Eastern Region of Ghana. This was gutted by fire in January 2016.

2020 election
Akua Donkor submitted her nomination forms to contest the 2020 presidential election in person to the Electoral Commissioner, Jean Mensa. Her running mate was Ernest Adakabre Frimpong Manso. In the election, she won 5,574 votes (0.04% of the total votes cast) to place 11th out of 12 aspirants. Akua Donkor was quick to concede to Nana Akufo-Addo prior to the formal declaration of the results by the Electoral Commission on 10 December 2020. She was also pleased to have made it onto the ballot this time round.

Electoral performance

Parliamentary elections

Presidential elections

See also
 List of political parties in Ghana

References

Political parties in Ghana
Political parties with year of establishment missing